Festival Siembra y Lucha is an open air metal festival held annually in San José, Costa Rica since 2012.

Lineups

2012
In its first edition the festival was held on November 24 with 13 local bands and Saurom from Spain as headlining.
  Saurom
  Nautilus
  Asedio
  Mythos
  Kronos
  Peregrino Gris
  Eternia
  Corpse Garden
  Advent Of Bedlam
  Heresy
  Grecco
  NothingariaN
  Forever Lost
  Seres

2013
In its second edition the festival was held from Friday, 6 December to Sunday, 8 December with 6 local bands and 19 international bands from 11 different countries.

  Primal Fear
  Mayhem
  Overkill
  Sabaton
  Orphaned Land
  Suffocation
  Immolation
  Tim "Ripper" Owens
  Stratovarius
  Korpiklaani
  Alestorm
  Tristania 
  WarCry 
  Sanctuary 
  Lujuria
  Kraken
  Gillman
  Virginia Clemm
  Delirium
  Saurom
  Colemesis
  Pneuma
  Advent Of Bedlam
  Grecco
  Final Trial
  Kronos

See also
List of music festivals in Costa Rica

References

Rock festivals in Costa Rica
Heavy metal festivals in Costa Rica
Events in San José, Costa Rica